The Minister for Emergency Management is an Australian Government cabinet position which is currently held by Murray Watt following the swearing-in of the full Albanese ministry on 1 June 2022.

In the Government of Australia, the minister administers this portfolio through the Department of Home Affairs.

List of Ministers for Emergency Management
The following individuals have been appointed as Minister for Emergency Management, or any of its precedent titles:

List of Ministers Assisting the Attorney-General on Queensland Floods Recovery
The following individuals have been appointed as Minister Assisting the Attorney-General on Queensland Floods Recovery, or any of its precedent titles:

References

External links
 

Emergency Management